The South Africa women's national field hockey team represents South Africa in international indoor hockey matches and tournaments.

Tournament history

Indoor Africa Cup 
 2017 – 
 2021 –

Indoor Hockey World Cup 
 2003  – 10th place
2007 – 11th place
2015 – 11th place
2018 – 11th place
2023 - 4th place

Current squad
Squad for the 2023 Women's FIH Indoor Hockey World Cup.

Head coach: Lennie Botha

See also
 South Africa men's national indoor hockey team
 South Africa women's national field hockey team

References

External links
 Official

Hockey, women's
Women's national indoor hockey teams